Syed Atiqur Rahman (born 21 May 1975), also known as Atiqur, is a Bangladeshi volleyball player who plays for the Bangladesh men's national volleyball team. He was one of the 15 players selected represent the country at the Bangabandhu Asian Men's Central International Volleyball Championship which was hosted by Bangladesh Volleyball Federation (BFV) at Shaheed Suhrawardy Indoor Stadium in 2018.

National and international participation 

 Bangabandhu Asian Men's Central International Volleyball Championship - 2018

References 

Bangladeshi sportspeople
Volleyball players